Toyota Field is a baseball park in Madison, Alabama. It is located west of Huntsville, the metropolitan area's largest city, and sits on a major thoroughfare, Interstate 565. It serves as the home of the Rocket City Trash Pandas, the relocated minor league team formerly known as the Mobile BayBears, a team that plays in the Southern League. It was scheduled to open April 15, 2020 and seats up to 7,000 people. Groundbreaking occurred on June 9, 2018. Toyota Motor Manufacturing Alabama purchased the naming rights to the stadium.

Because of the COVID-19 pandemic hitting the United States in the spring of 2020, the minor league baseball season that year was canceled. However, some limited-attendance public events were staged by the Trash Pandas that summer at Toyota Field to cultivate interest prior to the team's opening game on May 11, 2021.

The first football game played at Toyota Field will be held on October 15, 2022, between the North Alabama Lions from nearby Florence, and the Jacksonville State Gamecocks. The game will be the first college football game ever played in Madison, Alabama.

References

External links

 New renderings of Madison baseball stadium

Minor league baseball venues
Baseball venues in Alabama
Buildings and structures in Madison County, Alabama
2020 establishments in Alabama
Southern League (1964–present) ballparks
American football venues in Alabama
Rocket City Trash Pandas